WTCX (96.1 FM, "95.1 & 96.1 The Rock") is a radio station broadcasting a mainstream rock music format. Licensed to Ripon, Wisconsin, United States, the station is currently owned by Radio Plus, Inc. and features programming from CBS Radio Network, Westwood One, and Premiere Radio Networks.

WTCX was originally on 95.9 MHz. before moving to 96.1, and was co-owned with AM 1600, WCWC (now WRPN) with studios in Ripon, Wisconsin.

Other radio stations
From 1958 to 1972, WTCX was the call sign for a radio station in the Tampa Bay area. It was renamed as WQYK-FM in 1972.

Previous logo

References

External links

TCX
Fond du Lac County, Wisconsin
Ripon, Wisconsin